Victoria Casey  is a lawyer and King's Counsel from New Zealand. Her specialist areas are public law, commercial and commercial-regulatory litigation.

Casey attended the University of Auckland and was admitted to the bar in 1988. She was appointed Crown Counsel at Crown Law in 2008, and appointed a Queen's Counsel in 2016.

In 2015 Casey acted for vulnerable persons umbrella group CARE Alliance in the high-profile Lecretia Seales case, in which terminally ill Seales sought legal medical assistance to end her life.

References

Living people
New Zealand King's Counsel
21st-century New Zealand lawyers
University of Auckland alumni
Year of birth missing (living people)